The Dhaka Dynamites are a franchise cricket team based in Dhaka, Bangladesh, which plays in the Bangladesh Premier League (BPL). They are one of the seven teams that competed in the 2018–19 Bangladesh Premier League. The team was captained by Shakib Al Hasan.

Icon player
Shakib Al Hasan remained as the icon player from the previous season as he was retained before the draft.

Points table

Squad
 Players with international caps are listed in bold.
  denotes a player who is currently unavailable for selection.
  denotes a player who is unavailable for rest of the season

References

Bangladesh Premier League